Matvey Alexandrovich Guyganov (Russian: Матвей Гуйганов; born 28 July 1994) is a Ukrainian footballer who plays as a defender for Speranța.

Career

In 2017, Guyganov signed for Armenian side Urartu.

In 2018, he signed for Sevastopol (Russia) in Crimea.

In 2019, he signed for Lithuanian club Palanga.

In 2020, Guyganov signed for Speranța in Moldova.

References

External links
 

Ukrainian footballers
Living people
Association football defenders
1994 births
Expatriate footballers in Moldova
Expatriate footballers in Lithuania
Ukrainian expatriate footballers
Ukrainian expatriate sportspeople in Moldova
Ukrainian expatriate sportspeople in Lithuania
Ukrainian expatriate sportspeople in Armenia
Expatriate footballers in Armenia
Moldovan Super Liga players
Speranța Nisporeni players
FC Ararat Yerevan players
FC Urartu players
FC Sevastopol-2 players
A Lyga players
FK Palanga players
Armenian Premier League players
Ukrainian Second League players
FC Sevastopol (Russia) players
FC TSK Simferopol players
Crimean Premier League players
Sportspeople from Sevastopol
FC Mordovia Saransk players